Periaulax is an extinct genus of gastropods in the family Trochidae.

Species 
Species in the genus Periaulax include:
 Periaulax rimosus
 Periaulax tsheganica Amitrov, 2010 - It existed in what is now Kazakhstan during the Eocene period.

It formerly contained the species Periaulax spiratus, which is currently recognized as Margarites spiratus.

References

Trochidae
Prehistoric gastropod genera